Igor Bour, also known as Igor Lazăr or Igor Lazăr-Bour (born 18 December 1984) is a male weightlifter from Moldova. He is best known for winning the title at the 2007 European Championships in the men's – 56 kg division, defeating Vitali Dzerbianiou (second) and Igor Grabucea. At the 2008 European Championships he defeated Halil Mutlu and won gold medal with body weight, but later revealed he used metandienone.  He gave 4-year ban. After he return, he won silver medal at the 2013 European Championships, but failed doping again. According to the IWF rules, after the second doping violation Bour was banned for life by the IWF.

References

External links
 2007 results

1984 births
Living people
Moldovan male weightlifters
Doping cases in weightlifting
Moldovan sportspeople in doping cases
Sportspeople banned for life
European Weightlifting Championships medalists
20th-century Moldovan people
21st-century Moldovan people